Roberta Marrero (born 2 March 1972) is a Spanish artist, singer, and actress.

Artistic career
In her works as an illustrator, Roberta Marrero mixes and decontextualizes popular images, giving rise to new meanings, and using the technique of artistic appropriation. For example, in her first published book, Dictadores (2015), she transforms several photographs of icons of totalitarianism with images related to the pop world. She thus shows Mao Zedong surrounded by characters whose faces have been covered by Hello Kitty heads, and presents a portrait of Francisco Franco made up with a lightning bolt on his face, in the style of David Bowie on the cover of Aladdin Sane. With this publication, the artist stated that her intention was to "Vandalize a fascist message and turn it into another one of freedom."

In her 2016 book El bebé verde: infancia, transexualidad y héroes del pop, a graphic novel with a prologue by the writer Virginie Despentes, Marrero collects memories of her childhood and her transsexuality, explaining how the worldview of various artists from pop music, literature, and cinema inspired her, especially Boy George. The main themes in her work are power, death, fame, love, and politics.

In addition to exhibiting in Spanish galleries such as "La Fiambrera" in Madrid, some of her works have been included in exhibitions such as David Bowie Is, organized by the Victoria and Albert Museum in London, and Piaf, at the Bibliothèque nationale de France. Joe Dallesandro, model, actor and star of Andy Warhol's The Factory, chose one of her illustrations for limited edition t-shirts. Precisely, the author points to Warhol as her main influence. In addition, she samples from the Fauvist movement, expressionism, surrealism, Catholic religious painting, classical Hollywood, and punk.

In 2016 Marrero denounced British fashion designer Vivienne Westwood on social media, claiming that one of her works had been plagiarized on a shirt sold through Westwood's website. The designer and her husband Andreas Kronthaler responded that the image had been copied without knowledge that it was a work by a contemporary artist.

As a musician, Marrero has released two electropop albums and has worked as a DJ at several Spanish clubs.

Works

Publications
 Dictadores (2015), Ediciones Hidroavión, 
 El bebé verde: infancia, transexualidad y héroes del pop (2016), Lunwerg Editores, 
 We Can Be Heroes. Una celebración de la cultura LGTBQ+ (2018), Lunwerg Editores,

Discography
 A la vanguardia del peligro (2005)
 Claroscuro (2007)

Filmography
 Descongélate! (2003), directed by Dunia Ayaso and Félix Sabroso

References

External links
 
 

1972 births
21st-century Spanish actresses
21st-century Spanish women writers
Actresses from the Canary Islands
Spanish LGBT singers
Spanish LGBT writers
Living people
People from Las Palmas
Spanish contemporary artists
Spanish DJs
Spanish women singers
Spanish feminists
Spanish film actresses
LGBT DJs
Transgender singers
Transgender women musicians